Val Veny (also Val Vény) is a lateral valley of the Mont Blanc massif, lying to the south-west of Courmayeur. The valley head is at the Seigne Pass.

Geography
Val Veny was formed by two glaciers: the Miage Glacier and the Brenva Glacier.

Val Veny is divided into three parts:
 the part that lies parallel to the Mont Blanc massif, between the Seigne pass (2,512m) and part of the Miage Glacier
 the part called Plan Vény
 the mouth of the valley, dominated by Mont Blanc and the lower Brenva Glacier (1,444m)

Chécrouit Lake (2,165m) lies on the right side of the Val Veny, near Courmayeur. On the opposite side you can see Mont Blanc, the Dent du Géant (4,013 m ) and the Brenva Glacier.

At the entrance of the valley lies the shrine of Our Lady of Healing.

Mountaineering
Val Veny is the starting point of the normal Italian route on Mont Blanc via the Miage Glacier and the Francesco Gonella Refuge.

Shelters and bivouacs
 Refuge Mont-Blanc - 1,700m
 Refuge Maison Vieille - 1,956m
 Refuge Élisabeth - 2,195m
 Refuge Monzino - 2,590m
 Refuge Francesco Gonella - 3,071m
 Refuge Durier - 3,358m
 Refuge Quintino Sella - 3,363m
 Bivouac Lorenzo Borelli - Carlo Pivano - 2,310m
 Bivouac Adolphe Hess - 2,958m
 Bivouac Gino Rainetto - 3,047m
 Bivouac de la Brenva - 3,060m
 Bivouac Piero Craveri - 3,490m
 Bivouac Alberico - Borgna à la Fourche - 3,680m
 Bivouac Marco Crippa - 3,850m
 Bivouac Giuseppe Lampugnani - 3,860m

See also 
 Valdigne

Valleys of the Alps
Valleys of Aosta Valley